Cyperus thorelii is a species of sedge that is native to northern parts of Vietnam.

See also 
 List of Cyperus species

References 

thorelii
Plants described in 1910
Flora of Vietnam
Taxa named by Edmond Gustave Camus